may refer to:
 Andrés Sánchez (footballer)
 Andrés Sánchez (businessman)